Causeway End is a hamlet in Cumbria, England.

Hamlets in Cumbria
South Lakeland District